M'Boom is an album by American jazz percussion ensemble M'Boom led by Max Roach recorded in 1979 for the Columbia label.

Reception
The Allmusic review by Scott Yanow awarded the album 4½ stars stating: "This is a particularly colorful set that is easily recommended not only to jazz and percussion fans but to followers of World music".

Track listing
All compositions by Max Roach except as indicated
 "Onomatopoeia" (Omar Clay) - 5:17
 "Twinkle Toes" (Warren Smith) - 3:33
 "Caravanserai" (Joe Chambers) - 4:01
 "January V" - 3:24
 "The Glorious Monster" - 6:46
 "Rumble in the Jungle" (Clay) - 7:15
 "Morning/Midday" (Clay, Smith) - 6:50
 "Epistrophy" (Kenny Clarke, Thelonious Monk) - 4:28
 "Kujichaglia" (Roy Brooks) - 6:27
Recorded in New York City on July 25, 26 & 27, 1979

Personnel
Roy Brooks, Joe Chambers, Omar Clay, Fred King, Max Roach, Warren Smith, Freddie Waits - drums percussion, vibes, marimba, xylophone, timpani
Ray Mantilla conga, bongos, timpani, Latin percussion
Kenyatte Abdur-Rahman - percussion, bells

References

Columbia Records albums
Max Roach albums
M'Boom albums
1979 albums